The Grammy Award for Best Pop Duo/Group Performance is an award presented at the Grammy Awards, a ceremony that was established in 1958 and originally called the Gramophone Awards. According to the 63rd Grammy Awards category rules,  "this category recognizes artistic excellence in a duo, group, or collaborative vocal or instrumental pop performance. Recordings on which a group receives artist billing are eligible here, even when the vocal features only one member of the group. The entire group or collaborative performance, rather than the presence of a lead vocal performance, determines category eligibility".

The award goes to the performing artists. The producer, vocal arranger, engineer and songwriter can apply for a Winners Certificate.

It was one of several new categories for the annual Grammy Awards ceremony to start from 2012. It combines the previous categories for Best Pop Collaboration with Vocals, Grammy Award for Best Pop Performance by a Duo or Group with Vocals and Best Pop Instrumental Performance. The restructuring of these categories was a result of the Recording Academy's wish to decrease the list of categories and awards and to eliminate the distinctions between collaborations and duo or groups.

Lady Gaga is the first, and so far only, act overall to win this category multiple times, registering two wins as of date. Coldplay are the act with most nominations in this category, receiving a total of five nods, but they have yet to win in this category.

Recipients 

 Each year is linked to the article about the Grammy Awards held that year.

Artist with multiple wins 
2 wins
 Lady Gaga

Artists with multiple nominations 

5 nominations
 Coldplay

4 nominations
 Maroon 5

3 nominations
 Christina Aguilera
 Tony Bennett
 Justin Bieber
 Lady Gaga
 Ariana Grande
 BTS

2 nominations
 Camila Cabello
 The Chainsmokers
 Doja Cat
 Florence and the Machine
 Wiz Khalifa
 Post Malone
 Rihanna
 Nate Ruess
 Taylor Swift
 Justin Timberlake
 Pharrell Williams
 Zedd

References

External links 
 Official website of the Grammy Awards

 
Awards established in 2012
Pop Duo Group Performance
Duo Group Performance